First Watch is the first official album of Christian metal band Guardian. It was released in 1989 by Enigma Records and produced by Stryper's guitarist, Oz Fox.

This is the only album of the band (not including independent releases) to feature former members Paul Cawley (vocals) and Rikk Hart (drums). Both left the band after the tour supporting this album.

Track listing
All songs written by Guardian, except where noted.
 "I'll Never Leave You" - 4:31
 "Mystery Man" - 4:07
 "Livin' for the Promise" - 4:09
 "Miracle" - 4:55
 "Saints Battalion" - 3:46
 "Kingdom of Rock" - 3:25
 "The Good Life" - 4:41
 "One of a Kind" (Guardian and Gene Thurston) - 3:32
 "World Without Love" - 3:56
 "Rock in Victory" - 3:49
 "Hyperdrive" (Guardian and Mike Abbott) - 4:17
 "Marching On" - 3:54

Tracks 11 and 12 were not featured in the original album or cassette.

Personnel 
Guardian
 Paul Cawley – lead vocals, guitars
 Tony Palacios – lead guitars, vocals
 David Bach – bass, vocals
 Rikk Hart – drums

Guest musicians
 Brent Jeffers – keyboards
 Oz Fox – backing vocals, guitar solo (11)
 Leslie Fox – backing vocals (7)
 Robert Sweet – backing vocals (11)

Production 
 Oz Fox – producer, mixing
 Dan Nebenzal – engineer, mixing
 Mike Mierau – mixing, assistant engineer 
 Dino Elefante – assistant engineer, studio coordinator 
 Gene Eugene – assistant engineer 
 Dave Hackbarth – assistant engineer, studio coordinator 
 Allen Isaacs – assistant engineer
 Jeff Simmons – assistant engineer
 Eddy Schreyer – mastering 
 Paula Salvatore – studio coordinator 
 Dean Van Eimeren – art direction, design 
 Steve Cooper – photography 
 Maria Armoudian – management
 Jeff Gordon – management 

Studios
 Recorded at Sound City Studios (Van Nuys, California); Pakaderm Studios (Los Alamitos, California); Nevermore; Foxhole.
 Mixed at Pakaderm Studios
 Mastered at Capitol Mastering (Hollywood, California).

References

Guardian (band) albums
1989 debut albums